Norwegian National Road 41 (Rv 41; also known as the Telemarksveien) is a Norwegian national road that runs through Vestfold og Telemark and Agder counties in Norway. The road runs between the village of Brunkeberg in Kviteseid municipality in Vestfold og Telemark county in the north and Timenes in Hånes in the city of Kristiansand in Agder county in the south. The southern half of the road runs along the river Tovdalselva and the lake Herefossfjorden, and it is located in a fault zone called the Kristiansand-Porsgrunn grabenen.

The road passes through these villages in Kristiansand: Grovikheia and Tveit. The road passes through these villages in Birkenes: Mollestad, Birkeland, Søre Herefoss, and Herefoss. In Birkenes, it also passes by the Herefossfjorden and it has junctions with the Norwegian County Road 404 and Norwegian County Road 406. The road passes through the village of Hynnekleiv in Froland. The road passes through these villages in Åmli: Dølemo, Eppeland, and Åmli. The road passes through these villages in Nissedal: Treungen, Kyrkjebygda, and Nordbygdi. The road passes through these villages in Kviteseid: Eidstod, Kviteseid, and Brunkeberg.

The Telemark Road 
The road is known as the Telemark Road and this name is used for the marketing of the road and surrounding businesses. The road passes Hamresanden Beach and Kristiansand Airport, Kjevik in the south in Kristiansand municipality.  It then heads north through the municipalities of Birkenes, Froland, Åmli, Nissedal, and Kviteseid.  These are municipalities that tourists do not always find easily, so marketing the road has helped to bring people there.  The Telemark road goes through a lot of beautiful, Norwegian scenery as well.

References

External links 
 Telemarksveien - Visit Telemark website 

041
Roads in Agder
Roads in Vestfold og Telemark